Moyeni (Sesotho for "place of wind") is the camptown or the capital of the district of Quthing in Lesotho. It is the most southerly town in the country. Moyeni is divided into Lower Moyeni and Upper Moyeni. Lower Moyeni is largely used for commercial and residential purposes. Upper Moyeni is mainly for administrative purposes and residential place for government officials.

References

Populated places in Quthing District